Zoltán Kuhárszky (born 8 July 1959) is a former tennis player from Hungary who became a Swiss citizen in 1995. Kuharszky won two doubles titles during his professional career. He reached his highest singles ATP ranking on July 30, 1984, when he became the number 53 in the world, though he never won a singles title in his career.

Zoltan Kuharszky was the captain of the Hungary Davis Cup team from December 2014 to December 2016. He stepped down due to conflict of interest because he became the coach of Máté Valkusz who is a member of the Hungarian Davis Cup team. In the past, he coached Anke Huber, Jennifer Capriati, Ana Ivanovic, Myriam Casanova, Ágnes Szávay, Polona Hercog, and Petra Martić.

Career finals

Doubles (2 won, 3 lost)

References

External links
 
 
 

1959 births
Living people
Hungarian male tennis players
Hungarian tennis coaches
People with acquired Swiss citizenship
Tennis players from Budapest